Kollam Lok Sabha constituency (formerly Quilon Lok Sabha constituency) is one of the 20 Lok Sabha constituencies in Kerala state in southern India.

Assembly segments

Kollam Lok Sabha constituency is composed of the following assembly segments:

Corporations & Municipalities coming under Kollam Lok Sabha constituency
 Kollam - Corporation
 Paravur - Municipality
 Punalur - Municipality

Members of Parliament 

As Quilon Cum Mavelikkara in Travancore-Cochin

As Quilon/Kollam

Election Results

2019
According to Election Commission, there are 12,59,400(Women-6,59,597, Men-5,99,797, Transgenders-6) registered voters in Kollam Constituency for 2019 Lok Sabha Election. Kollam Constituency was polled 74.36% of total electorate.

2014

See also
 Kollam district
 List of Constituencies of the Lok Sabha
 Indian general election, 2014 (Kerala)
 2014 Indian general election

References

External links
 Election Commission of India: https://web.archive.org/web/20081218010942/http://www.eci.gov.in/StatisticalReports/ElectionStatistics.asp
Kollam Lok Sabha Elections Asianet News survey results 2019

Lok Sabha constituencies in Kerala
Politics of Kollam district
Government of Kollam
Constituencies established in 1952
1952 establishments in Travancore–Cochin